Edward Charles Follett (16 February 1842 – 6 June 1869) was an English first-class cricketer.

The son of Sir William Webb Follett, he was born in February 1842 at Westminster. He was educated at Eton College, before going up to Balliol College, Oxford. While studying law at Oxford, Follett was also a student of the Inner Temple. He played first-class cricket for the Marylebone Cricket Club against Oxford University at Oxford in 1868.  Opening the batting, he was dismissed twice in the match by Robert Miles for scores of 0 and 3. Follett died at Birmingham in June 1869.

References

External links

1842 births
1869 deaths
People from Westminster
People educated at Eton College
Alumni of Balliol College, Oxford
English cricketers
Marylebone Cricket Club cricketers